Bargaon is a village in Saharanpur tehsil, Saharanpur district, Uttar Pradesh, India.

According to the 2011 India Census the population of Bargaon was 1792; of those 960 were male and 832 female.

References

Villages in Saharanpur district